Mysterium Occupation is a 2004 Belarusian military drama film.

External links
Official webpage

2004 films
2004 drama films
Belarusian drama films